The Packard Eight was a luxury automobile produced by Packard between 1924 and 1936, and was an all new platform that took the top market position from the earlier Packard Twin Six which was first introduced in 1916. When it was introduced, it was designated as the Senior Packard until the company ended in the late 1950s.

Starting in 1928, new naming conventions were offered as four models, the Standard Eight, Custom Eight, De Luxe Eight,  and Speedster it was powered by a low-compression aluminum-head L-head inline eight producing  (hence the name). Packard ads bragged the engine "floated" on new rubber mounts.

The Eight offered optional (no extra cost) four-speed synchromesh transmission. Like other Packards of this era, it featured Ride Control, a system of dash-adjustable hydraulic shock absorbers.  The Eight also featured automatic chassis lubrication and "shatterproof" glass.

For 1938, the Eight's wheelbase was stretched  over 1937, and the body was also wider. 

It was advertised  as a two-door roadster, two-door convertible & two-door convertible Victoria (both new for 1932), phaeton, four-door dual-cowl phaeton & Sport Phaeton (a four-door four-seat dual-cowl phaeton new in 1932) two-door coupé, four-door sedan, landau, town car, and limousine. The Packard eight utilized a very rare swivel accelerator pedal, patented by Pat Au back in the early 1900s.

Production of the De Luxe Eight was less than ten per day. It was available in eleven body styles.

In 1930, the Eight was factory priced between US$2425 ($ in  dollars ) and US$2885 for the Standard Eight, US$3190 to US$3885 for the Custom Eight, and US$4585 to US$5350 ($ in  dollars ). In 1932, prices ranged from US$2250 to US$3250 for the Standard Eight, while the De Luxe Eight started at US$3150 ($ in  dollars ).

The Packard Speedster Eight Model 734 was a performance-oriented passenger car line by the Packard Motor Car Company offered for the 1930 model year (7th series) only. Based on a heavily modified Standard Eight (733) chassis, it got narrower and lower coachwork. The 734 straight eight engine is derived from the 740 Custom Eight's. It differs in valve and manifold revisions, a Detroit Lubricator dual updraft carburetor, a vacuum booster pump and a ribbed exhaust manifold. The engine delivers 145 HP (740: 106 HP) @3400 RPM without increase in bore or stroke, which remain at 3½ x 5 in. Retail prices started at USD$5,200 ($ in  dollars ) for the Boattail Speedster, Runabout Speedster and Phaeton Speedster, while the Victoria Speedster and Sedan Speedster went for USD$6,000 ($ in  dollars ). Speedster Eights have four instead of three speeds, and the customer could choose from several rear end ratios at no extra cost. 734 models have their parking lights mounted on the fenders, not on the body like Standard Eights. They also feature senior car's hoods with for ventilation door. Only 113 cars were built.

Available 734 Speedster Eight models include:

Body style #422 Boattail Roadster
Body style #443 Sedan
Body style #445 Phaeton
Body style #447 Victoria
Body style #452 Runabout

In 1931, Packard introduced the Individual Custom Eight, which were longer wheelbases of the Standard Eight. Period advertisements showed examples with body colored radiator grilles whereas the Standard models had chrome grilles.

The 1932 Standard Eight was offered in thirteen body styles. In 1933, base price of the Standard Eight was US$2150,  and was offered in fourteen body styles. The 1933 De Luxe Eight started at US$3350.

The five-passenger sedan was Packard's best-selling model for years. This helped Packard become the best-selling luxury brand between 1924 and 1930, as well as selling almost twice as many abroad as any other marque priced over US$2000.

References 

Eight
Rear-wheel-drive vehicles
1930s cars